Lajos Áprily (birth name Lajos Jékely; 14 November 1887 – 6 August 1967) was a Hungarian poet and translator who won the 1954 Attila József Prize for his contributions to Hungarian literature. Áprily was born 14 November 1887 in Brassó, Austria-Hungary (now the city of Brașov in Romania) and died 6 August 1967 in Budapest; he was the father of Zoltán Jékely (1913-1982), also a poet and translator.

Áprily's poems usually made use of classical forms and versification; they are characterized by impressionistic descriptions of nature. Major themes of his poetry are nature, family, grief over the loss of loved ones, and the ideas of peace, humanity and mutual respect between individuals and nations. His basic mood is warm, melancholic, reserved and unpretentious. He was a champion of disciplined, tight forms; his style embodied elegance, taste and refinement. From 1921 to 1965 he published several collections of poems and translations from French and Russian; he also wrote verse dramas, translating Pushkin's Eugene Onegin, Ibsen's Peer Gynt and other works.

Biography
Lajos Áprily's original name was Lajos Jékely. He attended elementary and secondary school in Parajd (now Praid, Romania) and Székelyudvarhely (now Odorheiu Secuiesc), two towns which still have Hungarian-speaking majority populations. From 1899, he studied at the Protestant Reformed College in Kolozsvár (now Cluj-Napoca). His teachers included famed musicologist and folklorist János Seprődi (1874–1923) and Hungarian writer and editor Dezső Kovács (1866–1935). To this day Cluj retains a sizable ethnic Hungarian minority population.

In 1909 Jékely earned his teacher's degree and became instructor of German and Hungarian language and literature at Bethlen Gábor Kollégium in Nagyenyed (Colegiul Național Bethlen, Aiud, Romania). In 1911 he married Ida Schéfer; in 1913, whilst they were still living in Nagyenyed, their eldest son, the poet, writer and translator Zoltán Jékely, was born.

After Kovács had reprimanded him over the supposed "modern tone" of some of his poems, Jékely refrained from publishing for several years. In 1918, however, he began using the pen name Lajos Áprily for his writings in the magazine Uj Erdély ("New Transylvania"). He soon became a member of three literary societies, Erdélyi Irodalmi Társaság, Kisfaludy Társaság and Kemény Zsigmond Társaság. By 1923 he had earned a degree in French language at the University of Burgundy in Dijon.

In 1926 he and his family returned to the town where he had studied from the age of 12, when it had been known as Kolozsvár, but in 1920, it became part of Romania. Here he taught languages and literature at the Reformed College. In 1928 he became editor of Erdélyi Helikon.

In 1929 the family moved from Romania to Budapest, where in 1934 the poet was named as director of Baár-Madas, at that time a boarding school for girls. One of his pupils there was the polyglot poet and translator Ágnes Nemes Nagy (1922-1991). In the fall of 1935 he began a half-year study tour in northern and western Europe. In 1942 the family moved back to Parajd in Transylvania (the Northern part of which returned to Hungary in 1940) for a short time, before they resettled in 1943 to Szentgyörgypuszta, a farm near Visegrád.

Works
 1921: Falusi elégia ("Rural elegy"), poems
 1923: Esti párbeszéd ("Evening dialogues"), poems
 1926: Rasmussen hajóján ("Rasmussen's ship"), poems
 1926: Vers vagy te is, poems
 1926: Idahegyi pásztorok, verse drama
 1934: Rönk a Tiszán, poems
 1934: Úti jegyzetek. Egy pedagógiai vándorlás megfigyelései("Travel notes: Pedagogical observations"), travelogue
 1939: A láthatatlan írás ("Invisible writing"), poems
 1964: Az aranyszarvas ("The golden stag"), translations
 1965: Fecskék, özek, farkasok ("Swallows, deer and wolves"), stories
 1965: Jelentés a völgyből ("Report from the valley"), poems
 1965: Ábel füstje ("Abel's Sacrifice"), selected poems

Selected poems in English translation
 Antigoné ("Antigone", Watson Kirkconnell, trans.)
 Március ("March in Transylvania", Ádám Makkai, trans.) 
 Kolozsvári éjjel ("Night in Kolozsvár", Watson Kirkconnell, trans.)
 Kérés az öregséghez ("Plea to old age", Doreen Bell, trans.)

References

External links
 Áprily Lajos oldala, Magyar Művek ("Hungarian works by Lajos Áprily"), Magyarul Bábelben, Typotex. Accessed 23 June 2013.

1887 births
1967 deaths
People from Brașov
Romanian people of Hungarian descent
Hungarian male poets
Translators to Hungarian
Translators from French
Translators from Russian
Romanian–Hungarian translators
20th-century translators
20th-century Hungarian poets
People from Visegrád
20th-century Hungarian male writers
Attila József Prize recipients